The Arizona Diamondbacks' 2009 season was the franchise's 12th season in Major League Baseball.

Regular season

Season standings

Record vs. opponents

Game log 

|-  style="text-align:center; background:#bfb;"
| 1 || April 6 || Rockies || 9–8 || Peña (1–0) || Grilli (0–1) || Qualls (1) || 48,799 || 1–0
|-  style="text-align:center; background:#fbb;"
| 2 || April 7 || Rockies || 3–0 || Jiménez (1–0) || Haren (0–1) || Street (1) || 26,637 || 1–1
|-  style="text-align:center; background:#fbb;"
| 3 || April 8 || Rockies || 9–2 || Morales (1–0) || Davis (0–1) || || 18,227 || 1–2
|-  style="text-align:center; background:#bfb;"
| 4 || April 10 || Dodgers || 9–4 || Garland (1–0) || McDonald (0–1) || || 31,036 || 2–2
|-  style="text-align:center; background:#fbb;"
| 5 || April 11 || Dodgers || 11–2 || Stults (1–0) || Petit (0–1) || || 35,024 || 2–3
|-  style="text-align:center; background:#fbb;"
| 6 || April 12 || Dodgers || 3–1 || Wolf (1–1) || Haren (0–2) || Broxton (3) || 25,485 || 2–4
|-  style="text-align:center; background:#fbb;"
| 7 || April 13 || Cardinals || 2–1 || Wellemeyer (1–1) || Davis (0–2) || Franklin (1) || 25,014 || 2–5
|-  style="text-align:center; background:#bfb;"
| 8 || April 14 || Cardinals || 7–6 (10) || Peña (2–0) || Thompson (0–1) || || 25,678 || 3–5
|-  style="text-align:center; background:#fbb;"
| 9 || April 15 || Cardinals || 12–7 || Piñeiro (2–0) || Garland (1–1) || || 21,298 || 3–6
|-  style="text-align:center; background:#fbb;"
| 10 || April 17 || @ Giants || 2–0 || Sánchez (1–1) || Haren (0–3) || Wilson (1) || 34,898 || 3–7
|-  style="text-align:center; background:#bfb;"
| 11 || April 18 || @ Giants || 2–0 || Davis (1–2) || Affeldt (0–1) || Qualls (2) || 37,409 || 4–7
|-  style="text-align:center; background:#fbb;"
| 12 || April 19 || @ Giants || 2–0 || Johnson (1–2) || Scherzer (0–1) || Wilson (2) || 35,350 || 4–8
|-  style="text-align:center; background:#bfb;"
| 13 || April 20 || Rockies || 6–3 || Garland (2–1) || Marquis (2–1) || Qualls (3) || 25,788 || 5–8
|-  style="text-align:center; background:#fbb;"
| 14 || April 21 || Rockies || 9–6 || Belisle (1–0) || Gutiérrez (0–1) || Corpas (1) || 25,411 || 5–9
|-  style="text-align:center; background:#bfb;"
| 15 || April 22 || Rockies || 2–0 || Haren (1–3) || de la Rosa (0–2) || Qualls (4) || 19,147 || 6–9
|-  style="text-align:center; background:#fbb;"
| 16 || April 24 || Giants || 5–1 || Lincecum (1–1) || Davis (1–3) || || 27,865 || 6–10
|-  style="text-align:center; background:#fbb;"
| 17 || April 25 || Giants || 5–3 || Miller (1–0) || Scherzer (0–2) || Wilson (3) || 37,253 || 6–11
|-  style="text-align:center; background:#bfb;"
| 18 || April 26 || Giants || 5–4 (12) || Gutiérrez (1–1) || Medders (0–1) || || 31,862 || 7–11
|-  style="text-align:center; background:#bfb;"
| 19 || April 27 || Cubs || 7–2 || Haren (2–3) || Lilly (2–2) || || 29,471 || 8–11
|-  style="text-align:center; background:#fbb;"
| 20 || April 28 || Cubs || 11–3 || Zambrano (2–1) || Petit (0–2) || || 30,351 || 8–12
|-  style="text-align:center; background:#bfb;"
| 21 || April 29 || Cubs || 10–0 || Davis (2–3) || Dempster (1–1) || || 26,999 || 9–12
|-  style="text-align:center; background:#fbb;"
| 22 || April 30 || @ Brewers || 4–1 || DiFelice (2–0) || Gordon (0–1) || Hoffman (2) || 26,464 || 9–13
|-

|-  style="text-align:center; background:#bfb;"
| 23 || May 1 || @ Brewers || 5–2 || Peña (3–0) || Villanueva (1–3) || Qualls (5) || 42,810 || 10–13
|-  style="text-align:center; background:#bfb;"
| 24 || May 2 || @ Brewers || 4–1 || Haren (3–3) || Looper (2–1) || Qualls (6) || 42,422 || 11–13
|-  style="text-align:center; background:#fbb;"
| 25 || May 3 || @ Brewers || 4–3 || Stetter (1–0) || Gutiérrez (1–2) || Hoffman (3) || 44,727 || 11–14
|-  style="text-align:center; background:#fbb;"
| 26 || May 4 || @ Dodgers || 7–2 || Stults (3–1) || Davis (2–4) || || 30,530 || 11–15
|-  style="text-align:center; background:#fbb;"
| 27 || May 5 || @ Dodgers || 3–1 || Weaver (1–0) || Scherzer (0–3) || Broxton (8) || 33,557 || 11–16
|-  style="text-align:center; background:#bfb;"
| 28 || May 6 || @ Padres || 3–1 || Garland (3–1) || Peavy (2–4) || Qualls (7) || 15,092 || 12–16
|-  style="text-align:center; background:#fbb;"
| 29 || May 7 || @ Padres || 4–3 (10) || Meredith (4–0) || Vásquez (0–1) || || 18,921 || 12–17
|-  style="text-align:center; background:#fbb;"
| 30 || May 8 || Nationals || 5–4 || Martis (4–0) || Petit (0–3) || Wells (1) || 28,640 || 12–18
|-  style="text-align:center; background:#fbb;"
| 31 || May 9 || Nationals || 2–1 || Lannan (2–3) || Davis (2–5) || Hanrahan (3) || 27,233 || 12–19
|-  style="text-align:center; background:#bfb;"
| 32 || May 10 || Nationals || 10–8 || Vásquez (1–1) || Kensing (0–2) || Qualls (8) || 25,086 || 13–19
|-  style="text-align:center; background:#fbb;"
| 33 || May 11 || Reds || 13–5 || Arroyo (5–2) || Garland (3–2) || || 17,640 || 13–20
|-  style="text-align:center; background:#fbb;"
| 34 || May 12 || Reds || 3–1 || Owings (3–3) || Haren (3–4) || Cordero (10) || 24,835 || 13–21
|-  style="text-align:center; background:#fbb;"
| 35 || May 13 || Reds || 10–3 || Cueto (4–1) || Augenstein (0–1) || || 20,443 || 13–22
|-  style="text-align:center; background:#fbb;"
| 36 || May 15 || @ Braves || 4–3 || González (2–0) || Peña (3–1) || || 32,593 || 13–23
|-  style="text-align:center; background:#bfb;"
| 37 || May 16 || @ Braves || 12–0 || Scherzer (1–3) || Kawakami (2–5) || || 30,162 || 14–23
|-  style="text-align:center; background:#bbb;"
| || May 17  || @ Braves || colspan=6 |Postponed
|-  style="text-align:center; background:#bbb;"
| || May 18  || @ Marlins || colspan=6 |Postponed
|-  style="text-align:center; background:#bfb;"
| 38 || May 19 || @ Marlins || 5–3 || Garland (4–2) || Johnson (3–1) || Qualls (9) || 10,131 || 15–23
|-  style="text-align:center; background:#fbb;"
| 39 || May 20 || @ Marlins || 8–6 || Volstad (3–3) || Davis (2–6) || Lindstrom (8) ||  || 15–24
|-  style="text-align:center; background:#bfb;"
| 40 || May 20 || @ Marlins || 11–9 (13) || Qualls (1–0) || Núñez (2–1) || Rauch (1) || 14,426 || 16–24
|-  style="text-align:center; background:#bfb;"
| 41 || May 21 || @ Marlins || 4–3 || Zavada (1–0) || Martínez (0–1) || Qualls (10) || 12,045 || 17–24
|-  style="text-align:center; background:#bfb;"
| 42 || May 22 || @ Athletics || 2–1 || Buckner (1–0) || Cahill (2–4) || Rauch (2) || 13,586 || 18–24
|-  style="text-align:center; background:#bfb;"
| 43 || May 23 || @ Athletics || 8–7 (11) || Peña (4–1) || Breslow (1–3) || Qualls (11) || 21,295 || 19–24
|-  style="text-align:center; background:#fbb;"
| 44 || May 24 || @ Athletics || 6–2 || Outman (2–0) || Garland (4–3) || || 13,792 || 19–25
|-  style="text-align:center; background:#fbb;"
| 45 || May 25 || Padres || 9–7 (10) || Mujica (2–1) || Peña (4–2) || Bell (13) || 30,546 || 19–26
|-  style="text-align:center; background:#bfb;"
| 46 || May 26 || Padres || 6–5 || Scherzer (2–3) || Correia (1–3) || Gutiérrez (1) || 18,631 || 20–26
|-  style="text-align:center; background:#fbb;"
| 47 || May 27 || Padres || 8–5 || Peavy (5–5) || Buckner (1–1) || Bell (14) || 18,264 || 20–27
|-  style="text-align:center; background:#bfb;"
| 48 || May 28 || Braves || 5–2 || Haren (4–4) || Lowe (6–3) || Qualls (12) || 19,452 || 21–27
|-  style="text-align:center; background:#fbb;"
| 49 || May 29 || Braves || 10–6 || Jurrjens (5–2) || Garland (4–4) || || 26,146 || 21–28
|-  style="text-align:center; background:#bfb;"
| 50 || May 30 || Braves || 3–2 (11) || Peña (5–2) || Bennett (2–2) || || 35,039 || 22–28
|-  style="text-align:center; background:#fbb;"
| 51 || May 31 || Braves || 9–3 || Medlen (1–2) || Scherzer (2–4) || || 30,020 || 22–29
|-

|-  style="text-align:center; background:#bfb;"
| 52 || June 1 || @ Dodgers || 3–2 || Buckner (2–1) || Kuroda (1–1) || Peña (1) || 32,304 || 23–29
|-  style="text-align:center; background:#fbb;"
| 53 || June 2 || @ Dodgers || 6–5 || Weaver (3–1) || Schlereth (0–1) || Broxton (12) || 32,853 || 23–30
|-  style="text-align:center; background:#fbb;"
| 54 || June 3 || @ Dodgers || 1–0 || Billingsley (7–3) || Garland (4–5) || Broxton (13) || 33,804 || 23–31
|-  style="text-align:center; background:#bfb;"
| 55 || June 5 || @ Padres || 8–0 || Davis (3–6) || Gaudin (2–4) || || 22,426 || 24–31
|-  style="text-align:center; background:#fbb;"
| 56 || June 6 || @ Padres || 6–4 || Correia (2–4) || Schlereth (0–2) || Bell (16) || 23,592 || 24–32
|-  style="text-align:center; background:#bfb;"
| 57 || June 7 || @ Padres || 9–6 (18) || Rosales (1–0) || Wilson (0–1) || || 27,804 || 25–32
|-  style="text-align:center; background:#fbb;"
| 58 || June 8 || @ Padres || 6–3 || Peavy (6–6) || Garland (4–6) || Bell (17) || 17,501 || 25–33
|-  style="text-align:center; background:#fbb;"
| 59 || June 9 || Giants || 9–4 || Cain (8–1) || Buckner (2–2) || || 22,428 || 25–34
|-  style="text-align:center; background:#fbb;"
| 60 || June 10 || Giants || 6–4 || Zito (3–6) || Davis (3–7) || Wilson (16) || 19,837 || 25–35
|-  style="text-align:center; background:#bfb;"
| 61 || June 11 || Giants || 2–1 || Scherzer (3–4) || Sánchez (2–6) || Qualls (13) || 24,389 || 26–35
|-  style="text-align:center; background:#bfb;"
| 62 || June 12 || Astros || 8–1 || Haren (5–4) || Hampton (4–5) || || 22,225 || 27–35
|-  style="text-align:center; background:#fbb;"
| 63 || June 13 || Astros || 6–4 || Oswalt (3–3) || Garland (4–7) || Hawkins (9) || 29,206 || 27–36
|-  style="text-align:center; background:#fbb;"
| 64 || June 14 || Astros || 8–3 || Moehler (3–4) || Buckner (2–3) || || 26,937 || 27–37
|-  style="text-align:center; background:#fbb;"
| 65 || June 16 || @ Royals || 5–0 || Meche (4–5) || Davis (3–8) || || 26,974 || 27–38
|-  style="text-align:center; background:#bfb;"
| 66 || June 17 || @ Royals || 12–5 || Scherzer (4–4) || Greinke (8–3) || || 29,777 || 28–38
|-  style="text-align:center; background:#bfb;"
| 67 || June 18 || @ Royals || 12–5 || Haren (6–4) || Hochevar (2–3) || || 14,129 || 29–38
|-  style="text-align:center; background:#fbb;"
| 68 || June 19 || @ Mariners || 4–3 || Batista (4–2) || Peña (5–3) || Aardsma (13) || 27,319 || 29–39
|-  style="text-align:center; background:#fbb;"
| 69 || June 20 || @ Mariners || 7–3 || Vargas (3–2) || Buckner (2–4) || Aardsma (14) || 29,525 || 29–40
|-  style="text-align:center; background:#fbb;"
| 70 || June 21 || @ Mariners || 3–2 || Lowe (1–4) || Zavada (1–1) || || 37,251 || 29–41
|-  style="text-align:center; background:#bfb;"
| 71 || June 23 || Rangers || 8–2 || Scherzer (5–4) || Harrison (4–5) || || 21,379 || 30–41
|-  style="text-align:center; background:#fbb;"
| 72 || June 24 || Rangers || 2–1 || Padilla (6–3) || Haren (6–5) || Wilson (7) || 20,031 || 30–42
|-  style="text-align:center; background:#fbb;"
| 73 || June 25 || Rangers || 9–8 || Guardado (1–1) || Vásquez (1–2) || Jennings (1) || 19,376 || 30–43
|-  style="text-align:center; background:#fbb;"
| 74 || June 26 || Angels || 12–3 || Weaver (8–3) || Buckner (2–5) || || 24,870 || 30–44
|-  style="text-align:center; background:#fbb;"
| 75 || June 27 || Angels || 2–1 || Oliver (2–0) || Qualls (1–1) || Fuentes (21) || 27,742 || 30–45
|-  style="text-align:center; background:#fbb;"
| 76 || June 28 || Angels || 12–8 || Palmer (7–1) || Scherzer (5–5) || || 25,684 || 30–46
|-  style="text-align:center; background:#bfb;"
| 77 || June 30 || @ Reds || 6–2 || Haren (7–5) || Arroyo (8–7) || || 22,725 || 31–46
|-

|-  style="text-align:center; background:#fbb;"
| 78 || July 1 || @ Reds || 1–0 || Cueto (8–4) || Garland (4–8) || Cordero (19) || 20,374 || 31–47
|-  style="text-align:center; background:#fbb;"
| 79 || July 2 || @ Reds || 3–2 || Cordero (1–2) || Zavada (1–2) || || 19,592 || 31–48
|-  style="text-align:center; background:#fbb;"
| 80 || July 3 || @ Rockies || 5–0 || de la Rosa (5–7) || Scherzer (5–6) || || 49,026 || 31–49
|-  style="text-align:center; background:#bfb;"
| 81 || July 4 || @ Rockies || 11–7 || Schoeneweis (1–0) || Peralta (0–2) || Qualls (14) || 49,096 || 32–49
|-  style="text-align:center; background:#bfb;"
| 82 || July 5 || @ Rockies || 4–3 || Haren (8–5) || Jiménez (6–8) || Qualls (15) || 27,547 || 33–49
|-  style="text-align:center; background:#bfb;"
| 83 || July 6 || Padres || 6–5 || Rauch (1–0) || Meredith (4–2) || || 17,528 || 34–49
|-  style="text-align:center; background:#bfb;"
| 84 || July 7 || Padres || 4–3 || Davis (4–8) || Correia (5–7) || Qualls (16) || 18,619 || 35–49
|-  style="text-align:center; background:#bfb;"
| 85 || July 8 || Padres || 6–2 || Zavada (2–2) || Burke (1–1) || || 20,791 || 36–49
|-  style="text-align:center; background:#fbb;"
| 86 || July 9 || Marlins || 14–7 || Calero (2–0) || Schoeneweis (1–1) || || 21,558 || 36–50
|-  style="text-align:center; background:#bfb;"
| 87 || July 10 || Marlins || 8–0 || Haren (9–5) || Nolasco (6–7) || || 21,307 || 37–50
|-  style="text-align:center; background:#bfb;"
| 88 || July 11 || Marlins || 5–1 || Garland (5–8) || West (3–4) || || 29,477 || 38–50
|-  style="text-align:center; background:#fbb;"
| 89 || July 12 || Marlins || 8–1 || Johnson (8–2) || Davis (4–9) || || 28,617 || 38–51
|-  style="text-align:center; background:#fbb;"
| 90 || July 17 || @ Cardinals || 6–1 || Carpenter (8–3) || Garland (5–9) || || 44,781 || 38–52
|-  style="text-align:center; background:#bfb;"
| 91 || July 18 || @ Cardinals || 4–2 || Haren (10–5) || Wainwright (10–6) || Qualls (17) || 45,267 || 39–52
|-  style="text-align:center; background:#fbb;"
| 92 || July 19 || @ Cardinals || 2–1 || Piñeiro (8–9) || Petit (0–4) || Franklin (22) || 41,759 || 39–53
|-  style="text-align:center; background:#fbb;"
| 93 || July 20 || @ Rockies || 10–6 || de la Rosa (7–7) || Davis (4–10) || || 40,444 || 39–54
|-  style="text-align:center; background:#bfb;"
| 94 || July 21 || @ Rockies || 6–5 || Gutiérrez (2–2) || Rincón (2–1) || Qualls (18) || 30,248 || 40–54
|-  style="text-align:center; background:#fbb;"
| 95 || July 22 || @ Rockies || 4–3 || Rincón (3–1) || Schoeneweis (1–2) || Street (24) || 30,451 || 40–55
|-  style="text-align:center; background:#bfb;"
| 96 || July 23 || Pirates || 11–4 || Gutiérrez (3–2) || Meek (1–1) || || 24,008 || 41–55
|-  style="text-align:center; background:#fbb;"
| 97 || July 24 || Pirates || 10–3 || Duke (9–9) || Petit (0–5) || || 24,911 || 41–56
|-  style="text-align:center; background:#bfb;"
| 98 || July 25 || Pirates ||  7–0 || Davis (5–10) || Ohlendorf (8–8) || || 26,037  || 42–56
|-  style="text-align:center; background:#bfb;"
| 99 || July 26 || Pirates || 9–0 || Scherzer (6–6) || Vasquez (1–5) || || 27,507 || 43–56
|-  style="text-align:center; background:#fbb;"
| 100 || July 27 || Phillies || 6–2 || Moyer (10–7) || Garland (5–10) || || 20,565 || 43–57
|-  style="text-align:center; background:#fbb;"
| 101 || July 28 || Phillies || 4–3 || Hamels (7–5) || Haren (10–6) || Lidge (20) || 25,044 || 43–58
|-  style="text-align:center; background:#bfb;"
| 102 || July 29 || Phillies || 4–0 || Petit (1–5) || Happ (7–2)  || || 22,952 || 44–58
|-  style="text-align:center; background:#bfb;"
| 103 || July 31 || @ Mets || 3–2 || Vásquez (2–2) || Green (1–3) || Qualls (19) || 38,241 || 45–58
|-

|-  style="text-align:center; background:#fbb;"
| 104 || August 1 || @ Mets || 9–6 || Feliciano (4–3) || Zavada (2–3) || Rodríguez (24) || 39,574 || 45–59
|-  style="text-align:center; background:#bfb;"
| 105 || August 2 || @ Mets || 5–2 || Garland (6–10) || Pelfrey (8–7) || || 38,374 || 46–59
|-  style="text-align:center; background:#bfb;"
| 106 || August 3 || @ Mets || 6–5 || Haren (11–6) || Figueroa (0–2) || Qualls (20) || 39,320 || 47–59
|-  style="text-align:center; background:#bfb;"
| 107 || August 4 || @ Pirates || 6–0 || Petit (2–5) || Duke (9–10) || || 11,294 || 48–59
|-  style="text-align:center; background:#bfb;"
| 108 || August 5 || @ Pirates || 4–3 || Davis (6–10) || Hanrahan (1–4) || Qualls (21) || 11,470 || 49–59
|-  style="text-align:center; background:#bfb;"
| 109 || August 6 || @ Pirates || 11–6 (12) || Rauch (2–0) ||Jackson (2–2) || || 17,311 || 50–59
|-  style="text-align:center; background:#fbb;"
| 110 || August 7 || @ Nationals || 7–6 || Bergmann (2–1) || Gutiérrez (3–3) || MacDougal (11) || 22,674 || 50–60
|-  style="text-align:center; background:#fbb;"
| 111 || August 8 || @ Nationals || 5–2 || Mock (1–4) || Haren (11–7) || Sosa (1) || 24,551 || 50–61
|-  style="text-align:center; background:#fbb;"
| 112 || August 9 || @ Nationals || 9–2 || Martin (1–2) || Petit (2–6) || Sosa (2) || 19,938 || 50–62
|-  style="text-align:center; background:#bfb;"
| 113 || August 10 || Mets || 7–4 || Davis (7–10) || Pelfrey (8–8) || || 23,069 || 51–62
|-  style="text-align:center; background:#bfb;"
| 114 || August 11 || Mets || 6–2 || Scherzer (7–6) || Hernández (7–7) || || 24,576 || 52–62
|-  style="text-align:center; background:#fbb;"
| 115 || August 12 || Mets || 6–4 || Feliciano (5–4) || Rauch (2–1) || Rodríguez (25) || 22,320 || 52–63
|-  style="text-align:center; background:#bfb;"
| 116 || August 14 || Dodgers || 4–1 || Haren (12–7) || Kershaw (8–7) || Qualls (22) || 31,573  || 53–63
|-  style="text-align:center; background:#bfb;"
| 117 || August 15 || Dodgers || 4–3 (10) || Qualls (2–1) || Troncoso (4–2) || || 42,058 || 54–63
|-  style="text-align:center; background:#fbb;"
| 118 || August 16 || Dodgers || 9–3 || Wolf (7–6) || Petit (2–7) || || 34,012 || 54–64
|-  style="text-align:center; background:#fbb;"
| 119 || August 17 || @ Braves || 9–4 || Hanson (8–2) || Scherzer (7–7) || || 23,668 || 54–65
|-  style="text-align:center; background:#fbb;"
| 120 || August 18 || @ Phillies || 5–1 || Moyer (11–9) || Garland (6–11) || || 45,186 || 54–66
|-  style="text-align:center; background:#fbb;"
| 121 || August 19 || @ Phillies || 8–1 || Lee (4–0) || Haren (12–8) || || 45,356 || 54–67
|-  style="text-align:center; background:#fbb;"
| 122 || August 20 || @ Phillies || 12–3 || Blanton (8–6) || Davis (7–11) || || 45,172 || 54–68
|-  style="text-align:center; background:#fbb;"
| 123 || August 21 || @ Astros || 1–0 || Oswalt (7–4) || Petit (2–8) || Valverde (19) || 30,032 || 54–69
|-  style="text-align:center; background:#fbb;"
| 124 || August 22 || @ Astros || 4–2 || Moehler (8–9) || Scherzer (7–8) || Hawkins (11) || 39,412 || 54–70
|-  style="text-align:center; background:#bfb;"
| 125 || August 23 || @ Astros || 7–5 || Garland (7–11) || Norris (3–2) || Qualls (23) || 30,612 || 55–70
|-  style="text-align:center; background:#fbb;"
| 126 || August 25 || @ Giants || 5–4 || Affeldt (1–1) || Rauch (2–2) || Romo (2) || 37,492  || 55–71
|-  style="text-align:center; background:#fbb;"
| 127 || August 26 || @ Giants || 4–3 || Miller (3–3) || Qualls (2–2) || Medders (1) || 27,645 || 55–72
|-  style="text-align:center; background:#bfb;"
| 128 || August 27 || @ Giants || 11–0 || Petit (3–8) || Martinez (3–2) || || 28,575 || 56–72
|-  style="text-align:center; background:#bfb;"
| 129 || August 28 || Astros || 14–7 || Scherzer (8–8) || Bazardo (0–1) || || 26,190 || 57–72
|-  style="text-align:center; background:#bfb;"
| 130 || August 29 || Astros || 9–0 || Garland (8–11) || Norris (3–3) || || 37,190 || 58–72
|-  style="text-align:center; background:#bfb;"
| 131 || August 30 || Astros || 4–3 || Haren (13–8) || Rodríguez (12–9) || Qualls (24) || 29,062  || 59–72
|-  style="text-align:center; background:#bfb;"
| 132 || August 31 || @ Dodgers || 5–3 (10) || Vásquez (3–2) || McDonald (4–4) || Gutiérrez (2) || 45,211 || 60–72
|-

|-  style="text-align:center; background:#fbb;"
| 133 || September 1 || @ Dodgers || 4–3 || Belisario (3–3) || Rosales (1–1) || Broxton (30) || 45,433 || 60–73
|-  style="text-align:center; background:#bfb;"
| 134 || September 2 || @ Dodgers || 4–1 || Scherzer (9–8) || Billingsley (12–9) || Gutiérrez (3) || 45,076 || 61–73
|-  style="text-align:center; background:#fbb;"
| 135 || September 3 || @ Dodgers || 4–2 || Garland (9–11) || Buckner (2–6) || Broxton (31) || 45,365 || 61–74
|-  style="text-align:center; background:#fbb;"
| 136 || September 4 || @ Rockies || 4–1 || Betancourt (2–3) ||  Boyer (0–2)  || Morales (2) || 31,401 || 61–75
|-  style="text-align:center; background:#fbb;"
| 137 || September 5 || @ Rockies || 5–4 || Contreras (6–13) ||  Davis (7–12)  || Morales (3) || 39,297 || 61–76
|-  style="text-align:center; background:#fbb;"
| 138 || September 6 || @ Rockies || 13–5 || de la Rosa (14–9) ||  Petit (3–9)  ||  || 35,192 || 61–77
|-  style="text-align:center; background:#fbb;"
| 139 || September 7 || Dodgers  || 7–2 || Padilla (10–6) ||  Scherzer (9–9)  ||  || 28,317 || 61–78
|-  style="text-align:center; background:#fbb;"
| 140 || September 8 || Dodgers || 5–4 || McDonald (5–4) ||  Schlereth (0–3)  || Broxton (34) || 22,589 || 61–79
|-  style="text-align:center; background:#bfb;"
| 141 || September 9 || Dodgers || 4–3 || Gutierrez (4–3) ||  Troncoso (4–3)  ||  || 20,025 || 62–79
|-  style="text-align:center; background:#fbb;"
| 142 || September 11 || Brewers || 6–3 || Looper (12–6) || Davis (7–13) || ||  || 62–80
|-  style="text-align:center; background:#fbb;"
| 143 || September 12 || Brewers || 9–2 || Bush (4–7) || Mulvey (0–1) || ||  || 62–81
|-  style="text-align:center; background:#fbb;"
| 144 || September 13 || Brewers || 5–3 || Villanueva (3–10) || Schlereth (0–4) || ||  || 62–82
|-  style="text-align:center; background:#bfb;"
| 145 || September 14 || @ Padres || 4–2 || Zavada (3–3) || Russell (2–1) || ||  || 63–82
|-  style="text-align:center; background:#bfb;"
| 146 || September 15 || @ Padres || 4–2 || Haren (14–8) || Bell (5–4) || ||  || 64–82
|-  style="text-align:center; background:#fbb;"
| 147 || September 16 || @ Padres || 5–6 || Bell (6–4) || Petit (3–10) || ||  || 64–83
|-  style="text-align:center; background:#bfb;"
| 148 || September 18 || Rockies || 7–5 || Rosales (2–1) || Flores (0–1) || ||  || 65–83
|-  style="text-align:center; background:#fbb;"
| 149 || September 19 || Rockies || 10–4 || Hammel (9–8) || Scherzer (9–10) || ||  || 65–84
|-  style="text-align:center; background:#fbb;"
| 150 || September 20 || Rockies || 5–1 || Jimenez (14–11) || Haren (14–9) || ||  || 65–85
|-  style="text-align:center; background:#fbb;"
| 151 || September 21 || Giants || 5–4 || Romo (5–2) || Vasquez (3–3) || ||  || 65–86
|-  style="text-align:center; background:#bfb;"
| 152 || September 22 || Giants || 10–8 || Davis (8–13) || Cain (13–7) || ||  || 66–86
|-  style="text-align:center; background:#fbb;"
| 153 || September 23 || Giants || 5–2|| Sanchez (7–12) || Mulvey (0–2) || ||  || 66–87
|-  style="text-align:center; background:#fbb;"
| 154 || September 25 || Padres || 4–0 || Correia (12–10) || Scherzer (9–11) || ||  || 66–88
|-  style="text-align:center; background:#bfb;"
| 155 || September 26 || Padres || 8–5 || Schlereth (1–4) || Gregerson (2–4) || ||  || 67–88
|-  style="text-align:center; background:#bfb;"
| 156 || September 27 || Padres || 7–4 || Buckner (3–6) || Mujica (3–5) || ||  || 68–88
|-  style="text-align:center; background:#fbb;"
| 157 || September 29 || @ Giants || 8–4 || Sanchez (8–12) || Davis (8–14)  || ||  || 68–89
|-  style="text-align:center; background:#fbb;"
| 158 || September 30 || @ Giants || 4–1 || Penny (11–9) || Mulvey (0–3) || ||  || 68–90
|-  style="text-align:center; background:#fbb;"
| 159 || October 1 || @ Giants || 7–3 || Lincecum (15–7) || Haren (14–10) || ||  || 68–91
|-  style="text-align:center; background:#bfb;"
| 160 || October 2 || @ Cubs || 12–3 || Buckner (4–6) || Gorzelanny (7–3) || ||  || 69–91
|-  style="text-align:center; background:#fbb;"
| 161 || October 3 || @ Cubs || 5–0 || Wells (12–10) || Cabrera (0–6) || ||  || 69–92
|-  style="text-align:center; background:#bfb;"
| 162 || October 4 || @ Cubs || 5–2 || Davis (9–14) || Dempster (11–9) || ||  || 70–92
|-

Roster

Player stats 

Note: Team batting and pitching leaders in each category are in bold.

Batting 
Note: G = Games played; AB = At bats; R = Runs scored; H = Hits; 2B = Doubles; 3B = Triples; HR = Home runs; RBI = Runs batted in; AVG = Batting average; SB = Stolen bases

Pitching 
Note: W = Wins; L = Losses; ERA = Earned run average; G = Games pitched; GS = Games started; SV = Saves; IP = Innings pitched; R = Runs allowed; ER = Earned runs allowed; BB = Walks allowed; K = Strikeouts

Farm system

References 

 2009 Arizona Diamondbacks season at Baseball Reference
 2009 Arizona Diamondbacks season Official Site (Archived 2009-06-20)

Arizona Diamondbacks seasons
Arizona Diamondbacks
Arizonia